New British Sculpture is the name given to the work of a group of artists, sculptors and installation artists who began to exhibit together in London, England, in the early 1980s, including Tony Cragg, Richard Deacon, Shirazeh Houshiary, and Richard Wentworth.

Tim Woods has characterized the movement by identifying four major themes, "(a) a synthesis of pop and kitsch, (b) a bricolage (assemblage) of the decaying UK urban environment and the waste of consumer society, (c) an exploration of the way in which objects are assigned meanings, and (d) a play of colour, wit and humour." An early champion was art dealer Nicholas Logsdail who exhibited many of the artists at his Lisson Gallery.

Artists

 Edward Allington
 Stephen Cox
 Grenville Davey
 Richard Deacon
 Barry Flanagan
 Anthony Gormley
 Shirazeh Houshiary
 Anish Kapoor
 Julian Opie
 Boyd Webb
 Richard Wentworth
 Rachel Whiteread
 Alison Wilding
 Bill Woodrow

References

British contemporary art
 
 
British artist groups and collectives
Lists of sculptors